The second season of the Tokyo Ghoul anime series, titled Tokyo Ghoul √A, is a direct sequel to the first season of the anime, picking up right where the final episode left off. The series is produced by Pierrot, and directed by Shuhei Morita. The anime aired from January 9 to March 27, 2015, on Tokyo MX, TVO, TVA, TVQ, MRO, BS Dlife and CS AT-X. 

The season roughly adapts the second half of the Tokyo Ghoul manga. Unlike the first season, however, Tokyo Ghoul √A does not directly adapt everything from the manga. Rather, it mixes in the manga's events and overall plotline with an anime original story written by the manga author Sui Ishida. The anime follows Ken Kaneki after he joins Aogiri Tree, as the group begins their battle against the CCG, who are trying to exterminate the ghoul organization.

The score is composed by Yutaka Yamada, who also produced the score for the first season.

TC Entertainment released the series in Japan onto six volumes from March 27 to August 28, 2015. A complete set containing all twelve episodes was later released on September 30, 2016.

Funimation licensed the series in North America, simulcasted the series on their website, produced an English dub as it aired, and released the series on home video on May 24, 2016. Madman Entertainment licensed the series in Australia and New Zealand, simulcasted the series on AnimeLab, and released the series on home video on July 6, 2016. Anime Limited licensed the series in the United Kingdom and Ireland, who simulcasted the series on Wakamin, and released the series on home video on June 13, 2016. The series ran on Adult Swim's Toonami programming block in the United States from July 9 to October 1, 2017.

Episode list

Home media

Notes

References

External links
  

Tokyo Ghoul episode lists